Bartatua (Akkadian:   or ) or Protothyes (Ancient Greek: ,;) was a Scythian king who ruled during the period of the Scythian presence in Western Asia in the 7th century BCE.

Name 

Historical background
In the 8th and 7th centuries BCE, a significant movement of the nomads of the Eurasian steppe brought the Scythians into Southwest Asia. This movement started when another nomadic Iranian tribe closely related to the Scythians, either the Massagetae or the Issedones, migrated westwards, forcing the Early Scythians of the to the west across the Araxes river, following which the Scythians moved into the Caspian Steppe from where they displaced the Cimmerians.

Under Scythian pressure, the Cimmerians migrated to the south along the coast of the Black Sea and reached Anatolia, and the Scythians in turn later expanded to the south, following the coast of the Caspian Sea and arrived in the steppes in the Northern Caucasus, from where they expanded into the region of present-day Azerbaijan, where they settled and turned eastern Transcaucasia into their centre of operations in Western Asia until the early 6th century BCE, with this presence in Western Asia being an extension of the Scythian kingdom of the steppes. During this period, the Scythian kings' headquarters were located in the steppes to the north of Caucasus, and contact with the civilisation of Western Asia would have an important influence on the formation of Scythian culture.

Life and reign 
Bartatua was the successor of the previous Scythian king, Išpakaia, and might have been his son. After Išpakaia had attacked the Neo-Assyrian Empire and died in battle against the Assyrian king Esarhaddon around 676 BCE, Bartatua succeeded him.

Raids in Media
In the later mid-670s BCE, in alliance with an eastern group of the Cimmerians who had migrated into the Iranian plateau, Bartatua's Scythians were menacing the Assyrian provinces of Parsumaš and Bīt Ḫamban, and these joint Cimmerian-Scythian forces together were threatening communication between the Assyrian Empire and its vassal of Ḫubuškia.

Alliance with Assyria
However, the Assyrians had started negotiations with Bartatua immediately after Išpakaia's death, and in 672 BCE he asked for the hand of Esarhaddon's daughter Serua-eterat in marriage, which is attested in Esarhaddon's questions to the oracle of the Sun-god Šamaš. Whether this marriage did happen is not recorded in the Assyrian texts, but the close alliance between the Scythians and Assyria under the reigns of Bartatua and his son and successor Madyes suggests that the Assyrian priests did approve of this marriage between a daughter of an Assyrian king and a nomadic lord, which had never happened before in Assyrian history; the Scythians were thus brought into a marital alliance with Assyria, and Serua-eterat was likely the mother of Bartatua's son Madyes.

Bartatua's marriage to Serua-eterat required that he would pledge allegiance to Assyria as a vassal, and in accordance to Assyrian law, the territories ruled by him would be his fief granted by the Assyrian king, which made the Scythian presence in Western Asia a nominal extension of the Neo-Assyrian Empire. Under this arrangement, the power of the Scythians in Western Asia heavily depended on their cooperation with the Assyrian Empire; henceforth, the Scythians remained allies of the Assyrian Empire. Around this time, the Urartian king Rusa II might also have enlisted Scythian troops to guard his western borderlands.

Conquest of Mannai
Over the course of 660 to 659 BCE, Esarhaddon's son and successor to the Assyrian throne, Ashurbanipal, sent his general Nabû-šar-uṣur to carry out a military campaign against Mannai, who had previously, in alliance with Bartatua's predecessor Išpakaia, expanded their territories at the expense of Assyria. After trying in vain to stop the Assyrian advance, the Mannaean king Aḫsēri was overthrown by a popular rebellion and was killed along with most of his dynasty by the revolting populace, after which his surviving son Ualli requested help from Assyria, which was provided through the intermediary of Ashurbanipal's relative, the Scythian king, after which the Scythians extended their hegemony to Mannai itself.

The marital alliance between the Scythian king and the Assyrian ruling dynasty, as well as the proximity of the Scythians with the Assyrian-influenced Mannai and Urartu placed the Scythians under the strong influence of Assyrian culture.

Bartatua was succeeded by his son, Madyes, who would bring Scythian power in Western Asia to its peak.

Saqqez inscription
An inscription from Saqqez written in the Scythian language using the Hieroglyphic Luwian script refers to the a king named , that is Bartatua.

Legacy
Graeco-Roman authors confused Bartatua with his predecessors and successors, including his son Madyes, into a single figure, also named Madyes, who led Scythians into defeating the Medes and the legendary Egyptian king Sesostris and imposing their rule over Asia for many years before returning to Scythia. Later Graeco-Roman authors named this Scythian king as Idanthyrsos or Tanausis, although this Idanthyrsos is a legendary figure separate from the later historical Scythian king Idanthyrsus, from whom the Graeco-Romans derived merely his name.

References

Sources

 
 
 
 
 
 
 
 
 
 

Scythian rulers
645 BC deaths
7th-century BC Iranian people
7th-century BC rulers